The characterization of the universe as finely tuned suggests that the occurrence of life in the universe is very sensitive to the values of certain fundamental physical constants and that the observed values are, for some reason, improbable. If the values of any of certain free parameters in contemporary physical theories had differed only slightly from those observed, the evolution of the universe would have proceeded very differently and life as it is understood may not have been possible.

History 
In 1913, the chemist Lawrence Joseph Henderson wrote The Fitness of the Environment, one of the first books to explore fine tuning in the universe. Henderson discusses the importance of water and the environment to living things, pointing out that life depends entirely on earth's very specific environmental conditions, especially the prevalence and properties of water.

In 1961, physicist Robert H. Dicke claimed that certain forces in physics, such as gravity and electromagnetism, must be perfectly fine-tuned for life to exist in the universe. Fred Hoyle also argued for a fine-tuned universe in his 1984 book The Intelligent Universe. "The list of anthropic properties, apparent accidents of a non-biological nature without which carbon-based and hence human life could not exist, is large and impressive", Hoyle wrote.

Belief in the fine-tuned universe led to the expectation that the Large Hadron Collider would produce evidence of physics beyond the Standard Model, such as supersymmetry, but by 2012 it had not produced evidence for supersymmetry at the energy scales it was able to probe.

Motivation 
Physicist Paul Davies has said, "There is now broad agreement among physicists and cosmologists that the Universe is in several respects ‘fine-tuned' for life". However, he continued, "the conclusion is not so much that the Universe is fine-tuned for life; rather it is fine-tuned for the building blocks and environments that life requires." He has also said that anthropic' reasoning fails to distinguish between minimally biophilic universes, in which life is permitted, but only marginally possible, and optimally biophilic universes, in which life flourishes because biogenesis occurs frequently". Among scientists who find the evidence persuasive, a variety of natural explanations have been proposed, such as the existence of multiple universes introducing a survivorship bias under the anthropic principle.

The premise of the fine-tuned universe assertion is that a small change in several of the physical constants would make the universe radically different. As Stephen Hawking has noted, "The laws of science, as we know them at present, contain many fundamental numbers, like the size of the electric charge of the electron and the ratio of the masses of the proton and the electron. ... The remarkable fact is that the values of these numbers seem to have been very finely adjusted to make possible the development of life."

If, for example, the strong nuclear force were 2% stronger than it is (i.e. if the coupling constant representing its strength were 2% larger) while the other constants were left unchanged, diprotons would be stable; according to Davies, hydrogen would fuse into them instead of deuterium and helium. This would drastically alter the physics of stars, and presumably preclude the existence of life similar to what we observe on Earth. The diproton's existence would short-circuit the slow fusion of hydrogen into deuterium. Hydrogen would fuse so easily that it is likely that all the universe's hydrogen would be consumed in the first few minutes after the Big Bang. This "diproton argument" is disputed by other physicists, who calculate that as long as the increase in strength is less than 50%, stellar fusion could occur despite the existence of stable diprotons.

The precise formulation of the idea is made difficult by the fact that we do not yet know how many independent physical constants there are. The standard model of particle physics has 25 freely adjustable parameters and general relativity has one more, the cosmological constant, which is known to be nonzero but profoundly small in value. But because physicists have not developed an empirically successful theory of quantum gravity, there is no known way to combine quantum mechanics, on which the standard model depends, and general relativity. Without knowledge of this more complete theory suspected to underlie the standard model, it is impossible to definitively count the number of truly independent physical constants. In some candidate theories, the number of independent physical constants may be as small as one. For example, the cosmological constant may be a fundamental constant, but attempts have also been made to calculate it from other constants, and according to the author of one such calculation, "the small value of the cosmological constant is telling us that a remarkably precise and totally unexpected relation exists among all the parameters of the Standard Model of particle physics, the bare cosmological constant and unknown physics."

Examples 
Martin Rees formulates the fine-tuning of the universe in terms of the following six dimensionless physical constants.
 N, the ratio of the electromagnetic force to the gravitational force between a pair of protons, is approximately 1036. According to Rees, if it were significantly smaller, only a small and short-lived universe could exist.
 Epsilon (ε), a measure of the nuclear efficiency of fusion from hydrogen to helium, is 0.007: when four nucleons fuse into helium, 0.007 (0.7%) of their mass is converted to energy. The value of ε is in part determined by the strength of the strong nuclear force. If ε were 0.006, a proton could not bond to a neutron, and only hydrogen could exist, and complex chemistry would be impossible. According to Rees, if it were above 0.008, no hydrogen would exist, as all the hydrogen would have been fused shortly after the Big Bang. Other physicists disagree, calculating that substantial hydrogen remains as long as the strong force coupling constant increases by less than about 50%.
 Omega (Ω), commonly known as the density parameter, is the relative importance of gravity and expansion energy in the universe. It is the ratio of the mass density of the universe to the "critical density" and is approximately 1. If gravity were too strong compared with dark energy and the initial metric expansion, the universe would have collapsed before life could have evolved. If gravity were too weak, no stars would have formed.
 Lambda (Λ), commonly known as the cosmological constant, describes the ratio of the density of dark energy to the critical energy density of the universe, given certain reasonable assumptions such as that dark energy density is a constant. In terms of Planck units, and as a natural dimensionless value, Λ is on the order of 10−122. This is so small that it has no significant effect on cosmic structures that are smaller than a billion light-years across. A slightly larger value of the cosmological constant would have caused space to expand rapidly enough that stars and other astronomical structures would not be able to form.
 Q, the ratio of the gravitational energy required to pull a large galaxy apart to the energy equivalent of its mass, is around 10−5. If it is too small, no stars can form. If it is too large, no stars can survive because the universe is too violent, according to Rees.
 D, the number of spatial dimensions in spacetime, is 3. Rees claims that life could not exist if there were 2 or 4 spatial dimensions. Rees argues this does not preclude the existence of ten-dimensional strings.
Max Tegmark has argued that if there is more than one time dimension, then physical systems' behavior could not be predicted reliably from knowledge of the relevant partial differential equations. In such a universe, intelligent life capable of manipulating technology could not emerge. Moreover protons and electrons would be unstable and could decay into particles having greater mass than themselves. (This is not a problem if the particles have a sufficiently low temperature.)

Carbon and oxygen 

An older example is the Hoyle state, the third-lowest energy state of the carbon-12 nucleus, with an energy of 7.656 MeV above the ground level. According to one calculation, if the state's energy level were lower than 7.3 or greater than 7.9 MeV, insufficient carbon would exist to support life. Furthermore, to explain the universe's abundance of carbon, the Hoyle state must be further tuned to a value between 7.596 and 7.716 MeV. A similar calculation, focusing on the underlying fundamental constants that give rise to various energy levels, concludes that the strong force must be tuned to a precision of at least 0.5%, and the electromagnetic force to a precision of at least 4%, to prevent either carbon production or oxygen production from dropping significantly.

Explanations 
Some explanations of fine-tuning are naturalistic. First, the fine-tuning might be an illusion: more fundamental physics may explain the apparent fine-tuning in physical parameters in our current understanding by constraining the values those parameters are likely to take. As Lawrence Krauss puts it, "certain quantities have seemed inexplicable and fine-tuned, and once we understand them, they don’t seem to be so fine-tuned. We have to have some historical perspective." Some argue it is possible that a final fundamental theory of everything will explain the underlying causes of the apparent fine-tuning in every parameter.

Still, as modern cosmology developed, various hypotheses not presuming hidden order have been proposed. One is a multiverse, where fundamental physical constants are postulated to have different values outside of our own universe. On this hypothesis, separate parts of reality would have wildly different characteristics. In such scenarios, the appearance of fine-tuning is explained as a consequence of the weak anthropic principle and selection bias (specifically survivorship bias); only those universes with fundamental constants hospitable to life (such as ours) could contain life forms capable of observing the universe and contemplating the question of fine-tuning in the first place.

Multiverse 

If the universe is just one of many, and possibly infinite universes, each with different physical phenomena and constants, it would be unsurprising that we find ourselves in a universe hospitable to intelligent life (see multiverse: anthropic principle). Some versions of the multiverse hypothesis therefore provide a simple explanation for any fine-tuning.

The multiverse idea has led to considerable research into the anthropic principle and has been of particular interest to particle physicists, because theories of everything do apparently generate large numbers of universes in which the physical constants vary widely. As yet, there is no evidence for the existence of a multiverse, but some versions of the theory make predictions of which some researchers studying M-theory and gravity leaks hope to see some evidence soon. Laura Mersini-Houghton claimed that the WMAP cold spot could provide testable empirical evidence for a parallel universe. Variants of this approach include Lee Smolin's notion of cosmological natural selection, the Ekpyrotic universe, and the bubble universe theory.

Top-down cosmology 
Stephen Hawking and Thomas Hertog proposed that the universe's initial conditions consisted of a superposition of many possible initial conditions, only a small fraction of which contributed to the conditions we see today. On their theory, it is inevitable that we find our universe's "fine-tuned" physical constants, as the current universe "selects" only those histories that led to the present conditions. In this way, top-down cosmology provides an anthropic explanation for why we find ourselves in a universe that allows matter and life, without invoking the ontic existence of the Multiverse.

Carbon chauvinism 
Some forms of fine-tuning arguments about the formation of life assume that only carbon-based life forms are possible, an assumption sometimes called carbon chauvinism. Conceptually, alternative biochemistry or other forms of life are possible.

Alien design 
One hypothesis is that extra-universal aliens designed the universe. Some believe this would solve the problem of how a designer or design team capable of fine-tuning the universe could come to exist. Cosmologist Alan Guth believes humans will in time be able to generate new universes. By implication, previous intelligent entities may have generated our universe. This idea leads to the possibility that the extra-universal designer/designers are themselves the product of an evolutionary process in their own universe, which must therefore itself be able to sustain life. It also raises the question of where that universe came from, leading to an infinite regress.

John Gribbin's Designer Universe theory suggests that an advanced civilization could have deliberately made the universe in another part of the Multiverse, and that this civilization may have caused the Big Bang.

Simulation hypothesis 
The simulation hypothesis holds that the universe is fine-tuned simply because it is programmed that way by people similar to us but more technologically advanced.

Religious apologetics 

Some scientists, theologians, and philosophers, as well as certain religious groups, argue that providence or creation are responsible for fine-tuning.

Christian philosopher Alvin Plantinga argues that random chance, applied to a single and sole universe, only raises the question as to why this universe could be so "lucky" as to have precise conditions that support life at least at some place (the Earth) and time (within millions of years of the present).

Philosopher and Christian apologist William Lane Craig cites this fine-tuning of the universe as evidence for the existence of God or some form of intelligence capable of manipulating (or designing) the basic physics that governs the universe.

Philosopher and theologian Richard Swinburne reaches the design conclusion using Bayesian probability.

Scientist and theologian Alister McGrath has pointed out that the fine-tuning of carbon is even responsible for nature's ability to tune itself to any degree.

The entire biological evolutionary process depends upon the unusual chemistry of carbon, which allows it to bond to itself, as well as other elements, creating highly complex molecules that are stable over prevailing terrestrial temperatures, and are capable of conveying genetic information (especially DNA). […] Whereas it might be argued that nature creates its own fine-tuning, this can only be done if the primordial constituents of the universe are such that an evolutionary process can be initiated. The unique chemistry of carbon is the ultimate foundation of the capacity of nature to tune itself.

Theoretical physicist and Anglican priest John Polkinghorne has stated: "Anthropic fine tuning is too remarkable to be dismissed as just a happy accident."

Theologian and philosopher Andrew Loke argues that there are only five possible categories of hypotheses concerning fine-tuning and order: (i) Chance, (ii) Regularity, (iii) Combinations of Regularity and Chance, (iv) Uncaused, and (v) Design, and that only Design gives an exclusively logical explanation of order in the universe. He argues that the Kalam Cosmological Argument strengthens the teleological argument by answering the question "Who designed the Designer?"

Creationist Hugh Ross advances a number of fine-tuning hypotheses. One is the existence of what Ross calls "vital poisons": elemental nutrients that are harmful in large quantities but essential for animal life in smaller quantities.

See also

References

Further reading 

 
 John D. Barrow (2003). The Constants of Nature, Pantheon Books, 
 Bernard Carr, ed. (2007). Universe or Multiverse? Cambridge University Press.
 Mark Colyvan, Jay L. Garfield, Graham Priest (2005). "Problems with the Argument from Fine Tuning". Synthese 145: 325–38.
 Paul Davies (1982). The Accidental Universe, Cambridge University Press, 
 Paul Davies (2007). Cosmic Jackpot: Why Our Universe Is Just Right for Life, Houghton Mifflin Harcourt, . Reprinted as: The Goldilocks Enigma: Why Is the Universe Just Right for Life?, 2008, Mariner Books, .
 Geraint F. Lewis and Luke A. Barnes (2016). A Fortunate Universe: Life in a finely tuned cosmos, Cambridge University Press. 
 Alister McGrath  (2009). A Fine-Tuned Universe: The Quest for God in Science and Theology, Westminster John Knox Press, .
 Timothy J. McGrew, Lydia McGrew, Eric Vestrup (2001). "Probabilities and the Fine-Tuning Argument: A Sceptical View". Mind 110: 1027–37.
 Simon Conway Morris (2003). Life's Solution: Inevitable Humans in a Lonely Universe. Cambridge Univ. Press.
 Martin Rees (1999). Just Six Numbers, HarperCollins Publishers, .
 Victor J. Stenger (2011). The Fallacy of Fine-Tuning: Why the Universe Is Not Designed for Us. Prometheus Books. .
 Peter Ward and Donald Brownlee (2000). Rare Earth: Why Complex Life is Uncommon in the Universe. Springer Verlag.
 Jeffrey Koperski (2015). The Physics of Theism: God, Physics, and the Philosophy of Science, John Wiley & Sons

External links 

Defend fine-tuning
 Anil Ananthaswamy: Is the Universe Fine-tuned for Life?
 Francis Collins, Why I'm a man of science-and faith. National Geographic article.
 Custom Universe, Documentary of fine-tuning with scientific experts.
 
 Hugh Ross: Evidence for the Fine Tuning of the Universe
 Interview with Charles Townes discussing science and religion.

Criticize fine tuning
 Bibliography of online Links to criticisms of the Fine-Tuning Argument. Secular Web.
 Victor Stenger:
 "A Case Against the Fine-Tuning of the Cosmos"
 "Does the Cosmos Show Evidence of Purpose?"
 "Is the Universe fine-tuned for us?"
 Elliott Sober, "The Design Argument." An earlier version appeared in the Blackwell Companion to the Philosophy of Religion (2004).

Intelligent design
Physical cosmology
Philosophical arguments
Fermi paradox
Astronomical hypotheses
Anthropic principle